Belcard Grodno is a football club based in Grodno. Club's name is derived from BelCard plant in Grodno (specializing in cardan shaft production), which has been a primary sponsor of the club and its youth academy.

History
The team was founded in 1992 as Kardan-Flyers Grodno. The team made its debut in Belarusian Second League in 1992–93 season. After successful 1993–94 season the team was promoted to the First League, where they played until 1998. Before 1998 season the team was renamed to Belcard Grodno. In 1999 Belcard merged with bigger local team Neman Grodno into Neman-Belcard Grodno. Their partnership ended in 2003.

Between 1999 and 2005 Belcard did not have a senior male team, but continued to participate in youth and women's competitions.

The senior team was reformed from in early 2006 as Dinamo-Belcard Grodno and rejoined Second League the same year. They immediately won the league and were promoted back to the First League, where they have been playing from 2007 onwards. In 2009 team's name was reverted to Belcard Grodno. In 2012 the club relegated back to the Second League, and after one season the senior team was once again disbanded. Since 2013 the club once again plays at the youth level and in women's league (as Niva-Belcard Grodno).

League and Cup history

External links
 Official Website 

Defunct football clubs in Belarus
Football clubs in Grodno
1992 establishments in Belarus
2006 establishments in Belarus
Association football clubs established in 1992
Association football clubs established in 2006
1998 disestablishments in Belarus
2012 disestablishments in Belarus
Association football clubs disestablished in 1998
Association football clubs disestablished in 2012